Veterans Memorial Elementary School may refer to:
 Veterans Memorial Elementary School - Reno, Nevada - Washoe County School District
 Veterans Memorial Elementary School - Laredo, Texas - United Independent School District
 Veterans Memorial Elementary School - Roma, Texas - Roma Independent School District
 Veterans' Memorial Elementary School - Gloucester, Massachusetts - Gloucester Public Schools
 Veterans Memorial Elementary School - Provincetown, Massachusetts - Provincetown Public Schools

See also
 David C. Douglass Veterans Memorial School - Lower Township, New Jersey - Lower Township School District